Kolari is a village in the municipality of Kičevo, North Macedonia. It used to be part of the former Zajas Municipality.

Demographics
As of the 2021 census, Kolari had 421 residents with the following ethnic composition:
Albanians 388
Persons for whom data are taken from administrative sources 33

According to the 2002 census, the village had a total of 880 inhabitants. Ethnic groups in the village include:
Albanians 879
Macedonians 1

References

Villages in Kičevo Municipality
Albanian communities in North Macedonia